Early Work is a poetry collection by Patti Smith, published in 1994.

Contents

1970–1972 
 "Prayer"
 "Ballad of a Bad Boy"
 "Oath"
 "Anna of the Harbor"
 "The Sheep Lady from Algiers"
 "Work Song"
 "Notebook"
 "Conversation with the Kid"
 "The Ballad of Hagen Walker"
 "Seventh Heaven"
 "Amelia Earhart"
 "k.o.d.a.k."
 "Dog Dream"
 "Jeanne d'Arc"
 "A Fire of Unknown Origin"
 "Death by Water"
 "The Amazing Tale of Skunkdog"

1973–1974 
 "Notice"
 "Witt"
 "Piss Factory"
 "Balance"
 "Dream of Rimbaud"
 "Notice 2"
 "Judith Revisited"
 "Georgia O'Keeffe"
 "Picasso Laughing"
 "Rape"
 "Gibralto"
 "Ha! Ha! Houdini!"
 "Schinden"
 "16 February"
 "Jet Flakes"
 "Translators"
 "Easter"

1975–1976 
 "Neo Boy"
 "Sohl"
 "Land"
 "Suite"
 "Grant"
 "December"
 "Doctor Love"
 "AFTER/WORDS"
 "ps/alm 23 revisited"
 "Rimbaud Dead"
 "Thermos"
 "The Ballad of Isabelle Eberhardt"
 "Corps de Plane"
 "Babelfield"
 "Babelogue"

1977–1979 
 "High on Rebellion"
 "The Salvation of Rock"
 "Hymn"
 "Munich"
 "Health Lantern"
 "Penicillin"
 "Robert Bresson"
 "Burning Roses"
 "Thread"
 "A Fleet of Deer"
 "Scream of the Butterfly"
 "Y"
 "Combe"
 "Wave"
 "Florence"
 "Wing"
 "Italy"
 "True Music"

Notes

External links 
 Early Work at W. W. Norton & Company
 
 Early Work at Library Journal

American poetry collections
Poetry by Patti Smith
1994 poetry books
Books by Patti Smith
W. W. Norton & Company books